Satudarah MC is a one-percenter outlaw motorcycle club that has spread the globe since being founded in the Netherlands town of Moordrecht in 1990.

Criminal activities
Members of Satudarah MC are frequently brought into connection with drug trafficking, murder, extortion and weapon trafficking.

Global distribution

Satudarah MC has 44 chapters throughout the Netherlands and has opened in Belgium, France, Ireland, Spain, Indonesia, Malaysia, Denmark, Sweden, Germany, Morocco, Norway, Singapore, Thailand, Viet Nam, Curacao, Suriname, Switzerland, South Africa, Canada, Australia and Turkey.

Australia
The national president of Satudarah, who is based in Melbourne, said in 2018 that chapters had been established in all Australian states, as well as a club in Canberra that had recently been patched over. The Sydney chapter had been shut down several years previously. In 2019, splinter groups in Western Australia were said to be bashing each other's members.

Netherlands
In the Netherlands, Satudarah MC is considered extremely violent and ruthless, more so than the Hells Angels. On 18 June 2018, the Dutch justice system announced a complete ban on the motorcycle club. The Court sentenced an immediate civil ban of all chapters and related clubs.
The ethnic makeup of the club includes Dutch, Ambonese, Surinamese and others.

References

External links

Outlaw motorcycle clubs
Motorcycle clubs in the Netherlands
Gangs in the Netherlands
Organized crime groups in Europe